The Mosley Hill Formation is a geologic formation in Louisiana. It preserves fossils dating back to the Paleogene period.

See also

 List of fossiliferous stratigraphic units in Louisiana
 Paleontology in Louisiana

References
 

Geologic formations of Louisiana
Paleogene Louisiana